The following is a list of characters in the W.I.T.C.H. comics. The series revolves around five teenage girls who possess magical powers over the first five elements of nature and are revealed to be the second generation of Guardians of the ethereal, mystical planet Kandrakar (Candracar).

Main characters 
The main characters all serve as Guardians of Kandrakar.
 Wilhelmina "Will" Vandom – 12 years old( from episode 5 13 years old) leader of W.I.T.C.H. and the keeper of the Heart of Kandrakar. She has red hair and brown eyes . She moves to Heatherfield with her newly divorced mother after leaving her hometown of Fadden Hills. Will has power over absolute energy, allowing her to project electricity and call down lightning. She can bring electrical appliances to life, granting them distinct personalities and the ability to speak. She also develops animal empathy, in contrast to Irma's limited mind control and Taranee's ever developing telepathic abilities. In issue 80 (Emotions) Will's half-brother William was born. Later on, William found that he is magical like Will.
 Irma Lair – 13-year-old Irma is the comedic. She has auburn hair and blue eyes The Guardian of Water, she has the power to manipulate water around her; she is later able to create water from thin air. She can implant mental suggestions into people's minds, and can see visions in water via hydromancy. 
 Taranee Cook – 13-year-old Taranee is the Guardian of Fire. She has black-blue  hair and brown eyes .She is timid and bashful and has been known to be very intelligent and willing to help out in school and when W.I.T.C.H. goes into action. She was born on March 23, and her zodiac sign is Aries. Taranee learned that she was adopted in issue 78.
 Cornelia Hale – 14-year-old Cornelia is vain, but is very loyal and friendly.She has blonde hair and light blue eyes .The Guardian of Earth, she can control earthen matter such as stone, dirt, certain metals and she can manipulate the growth of plants. She later gains telekinesis and prophetic visions.
 Hay Lin – 13-year-old Hay Lin is cheerful, creative, and sometimes enthusiastic. She has black-purple hair and brown eyes . The Guardian of Air, she can control air and wind, and can use air to manipulate sound. She later develops psychometry.

Secondary characters

Boys 
 Matt Olsen – Will's love interest, who sings and plays guitar for the band "Cobalt Blue". During the Trial of the Oracle story arc, he becomes aware of W.I.T.C.H., and after Will tells him of her secret, their relationship progresses. Later, during the New Powers arc, the old Oracle Himerish secretly makes him an emissary of Kandrakar and W.I.T.C.H.'s tutor for the ensuing crisis.
 Martin Tubbs – A student at Sheffield Institute and peer of the Guardians who is infatuated with Irma.
 Andrew Hornby – Irma's first serious crush, who she tries to flirt with, but ended up turning him into a frog.
 Stephen – Irma's boyfriend as of the seventh saga. He was her boyfriend when they went to camp together. He is a member of the U18, a group of young vigilantes living and working (literally) underground. Irma later tells him about her magical powers (though not about W.I.T.C.H.), and he becomes her confidante.
 Nigel Ashcroft – A former silent and reflective member of Uriah's gang, who eventually leaves their company when he develops feelings for Taranee. He tries his best to prove to Taranee and her family (especially her mother) of his good intentions. After Taranee started spending more time at the Jensen Dance Academy and less with him, they have an argument which leads Taranee to break up with him. After the breakup, he appears as a minor character in the comics.
 Caleb – Cornelia's first serious crush, who is leader of the rebel forces opposed to Phobos' rule and quickly gains popularity throughout Meridian. Later he becomes a denizen of Meridian under Elyon's rule.
 Peter Lancelot Cook – Taranee's older brother and Cornelia's current boyfriend. He is kind and loves to spend time with his family. He enjoys sports that require physical endurance. In the past, despite Cornelia's love for Caleb, she could not help but find Peter cute (a feeling which he reciprocated), leading her to avoid him. In the course of the Ragorlang saga, Peter and Cornelia start going out more and eventually admit their love for each other.
 Eric Lyndon – Hay Lin's crush and later boyfriend, who lives at the Heatherfield Observatory with his astronomer grandfather, Zachary. He is crazy about science and technology and has a great imagination. He owns an electric scooter and loves to play basketball. Hay Lin and Eric met when she was rollerblading and ran into his motor scooter. He moves away in the fifth saga, but continues to video-chat with Hay Lin.

The Council of Kandrakar
A few members of the Council/Congregation of Kandrakar are human, such as Yan Lin, but the others are alien—as seen by the Guardians after the demise of Nerissa.

 The Oracle – Originally a denizen of the world of Basiliade by the name of Himerish, he is the ruler of Kandrakar and gave the girls their powers. He possesses dimension-breaching powers, but acts as a guardian for the maintenance of the balance of power and is cautious in using his abilities. Originally aloof and occasionally committing errors. In the Endarno story arc the Oracle was deposed by the devious Phobos, who had assumed his friend Endarno's identity. After he is stripped of his name and position as the Oracle and banished to Basilíade, his experience as a mortal makes him more friendly towards the Guardians after his reinstatement. When the threat of the Dark Mother becomes known, he enacts a controversial and unsuccessful plan to defeat her, due to him underestimating the villain's powers. He steps down as Oracle and gives the title to Yan Lin, who had recognized the threat. In the final chapter of the arc Magical Sovereigns, Himerish returns to Kandrakar to meet the Girls. He is invited to celebrate with the Guardians after they successfully become Magical Sovereigns.
 Yan Lin – Hay Lin's grandmother, a member of W.I.T.C.H.'s predecessors and a member of the Congregation. She is a wise and perceptive person, offering advice to the girls. She was the previous Guardian of Air and the only ex-Guardian to remain faithful to the Oracle. In her last days on Earth, Yan Lin assisted her granddaughter and her friends in becoming familiar with their magical powers and gave them the Heart of Kandrakar; with her death, she passed into the halls of Kandrakar to join the Oracle's council. At the end of the New Power series, Yan Lin becomes the new Oracle.
Halinor – see below
 Tibor – The first Oracle's faithful advisor. He has served the Oracle for centuries, and often argues with Luba.

Minor Members
 Bolgo – An elfin old man who inquired if the Oracle recommended Kandrakar to intervene during the final battle against Phobos. He also discussed the Oracle's decision to simply wait and see "how events unfold" with other Council members, including Luba and Althor.
 Althor – An old man who resembles an elf or a dwarf who first appears asking the Oracle who should be the new Guardians, next appearing during the battle against Phobos where he listens to Bolgo when he discusses the Oracle's decision to simply wait and see "how events unfold".
 As-Sharwa – One of the oldest and wisest of the inhabitants of Kandrakar and the elected Voice of the Congregation. He has an elongated forehead tattooed with mystical runes, long gray hair and wrinkles. Representing the Council he informs the Oracle that the Congregation does not wish to use the destructive power of the Resonance, to counteract Nerissa's attacks on Kandrakar as the results might be catastrophic for Kandrakar and Nerissa. The Oracle insists that they activate the Resonance, as it may be their last hope. Below his chin is a device that might be a speech translator.

The board of Northern Lords 
  Board of Northern Lords – Governing board of a cold and mountainous country north of Meridian consisting of elderly gentlemen. They have a powerful army of humans and are independent. When Elyon sends homeless ogar north and unwittingly unleashes a war council, the Guardians agree with the Lords.
 Lord Regnar – one of the youngest councillors who helps W.I.T.C.H and is committed to preserving peace.
 Lord Balder – The grand master or lord supreme council of the north. Usually compels unanimous decisions, yet when settlers arrive does not hesitate to send an emissary. He is a great friend of Lord Regnar.

Former Guardians of the Veil
The original five Guardians of the Veil many decades before W.I.T.C.H. Their first initials make up the word C.H.Y.K.N. (pronounced "Chicken"):
 Cassidy – A russet-haired woman and original Guardian of Water. She was entrusted with the Heart after Nerissa's betrayal, but was later killed by an increasingly bitter and jealous Nerissa, in retaliation, by being pushed off a cliff on Mount Thanos. Cassidy's star appeared at Will's birth, and she eventually makes a spiritual connection with Will. Cassidy, before she was killed by Nerissa, was a caring and life-loving woman who was close to her mother and has the same water-based powers as Irma.
 Halinor – The original Guardian of Fire. A blonde-haired woman and past Guardian of Fire, now deceased. She kept a diary that told of the Star of Cassidy. Like Kadma, Halinor was banished from Kandrakar for questioning the Oracle's power. She was a founding member of the Rising Star Foundation and her diary talks about the Star of Cassidy. Before she died she was best friends and inseparable from Kadma. Halinor is kindhearted, although she can be aggressive and insecure, and has the same powers as Taranee.  
Yan Lin – see above
 Kadma – The original Guardian of Earth. She and Halinor were banished from Kandrakar for questioning the Oracle's power when Nerissa killed Cassidy out of envy. She secretly guides Will through the Rising Star Foundation in Fadden Hills until Will moves to Heatherfield and becomes a Guardian. She later helps Will in series two by giving her Halinor's diary, which Eric's grandfather decodes. She helps Will by getting rid of her greedy father who wants to take Will away. Kadma resides on Earth. Even though she is no longer connected to an Auramere, she still has the same earth-based powers as Cornelia.
Nerissa (see also below) – The original keeper of the Heart of Kandrakar and Guardian of Quintessence, the fifth element. She was gradually consumed by the Heart's mighty power, and turned against her fellow Guardians. Enraged that the Oracle had given the Heart of Kandrakar to Cassidy, she had lured her into a trap and destroyed her. She was then imprisoned in a cave on Mount Thanos and would never be released until "the five powers were united." She came to covet the Heart of Kandrakar even more, and planned to steal it from Will at any cost. W.I.T.C.H. co-creator and designer Alessandro Barbucci has stated that himself and Barbara Canepa left the project before Nerissa's concept were created.

Antagonists

Part I antagonists 
 Prince Phobos Escanor (originally known as "Prince Phobos Portrait") – The prince of Meridian, who rules his world while searching for his sister (rightful heir to the throne) to absorb her immense magical powers. Although considered an immortal possibly thousands of years old, he spends most of his time in his castle, granting few audiences. Phobos plans to use Elyon's powers and the Heart of Kandrakar to destroy the veil sealing him within Meridian and spread his life-absorbing powers to other worlds. The only ones standing in his way are the five Guardians of Kandrakar. His motives were eventually exposed to Elyon and after a climactic battle with his sister and the Guardians, Phobos was defeated and his place as ruler of Meridan rightfully given to Elyon. The name "Phobos" means "fear" in Greek, and came from the name of the Greek God.
 Lord Cedric – A general of Phobos' army, who is a shape shifter with two forms, one human and one animal. In his human form Cedric is a young and slender Caucasian man with neatly-kept blonde hair wearing a green robe. In his animal form, he is a green-tailed, red-banded snake-like creature with the power to slither up mountains, shoot energy blasts, raise magical barriers, trap others in impenetrable bubbles, disrupt other's memories, telekinesis and feel Will's presence. He was entrusted with the task of apprehending Caleb and finding Elyon on Earth, opening the "Ye Olde Book Shop" on Earth under a human identity, Cedric Hoffman. Despite his orders to deceive Elyon, he felt affection for her. In the comics, he falls in love with Orube, but dies shortly afterwards when he sacrifices himself to save her from Ludmoore.
 Princess Elyon Brown/Escanor (originally "Elyon Portrait") – Cornelia's childhood friend in Heatherfield, who is really Phobos' long-lost sister, destined to become the Light of Meridian, a savior position exclusive to the females of the Royal Family. Phobos eventually reveals her true heritage and abducts her to Meridian, but only to claim her power for his own. Thanks to his lies, Elyon gets the impression the Guardians are the enemies at the beginning. In time she realizes Phobos' viciousness, and in a climactic battle with her brother she is rightfully restored to the throne and renews her friendship with W.I.T.C.H. She rules over Meridian since that time, with Vathek and later Caleb as her advisors.
Vathek – A blue-skinned, large denizen of Meridian. Originally Cedric's henchman, Vathek eventually turns against him and joins the Meridian rebel army under Caleb. He becomes a close friend to W.I.T.C.H., Elyon and Caleb, and following Phobo's first defeat, one of Elyon's most trusted servants and confidants.
 Frost the Hunter – Foremost among Phobos’ warrior's and a formidable tracker. Frost had never lost a battle prior to his defeat at the hands of the five Guardians. Frost swears revenge and devises plans for the Guardians' demise. In combat he rides a large green rhinoceros-like mount named Crimson and wields a magical blade that can deflect enemy spells and fire energy blasts at his opponents. When the Veil is lowered, he finds himself in Heatherfield. He takes the opportunity to take revenge although the weakened Guardians defeat him by intelligence rather than strength. He is imprisoned in the Tower of Mists.

Part II antagonists 
 Nerissa (see also above) – The previous keeper of the Heart of Kandrakar, who was consumed by the immense power the Heart gave her and eventually began to descend into evil. The Oracle senses this and decides that she is no longer fit to keep the Heart and entrusts it to Cassidy, driving Nerissa over the edge. Mad with jealousy, she turns on her fellow guardians and kills Cassidy. Subsequently, defeated, she is sentenced to be sealed in a coffin located in Mount Thanos until the Aurameres are joined. That eventually comes to pass through the efforts of Luba, who is convinced that the girls are unworthy of their status as Guardians. Awakening from her slumber Nerissa creates the Four Knights of Revenge and, after capturing Caleb, she rejuvenates and declares war on Kandrakar. In issue 22 she attempts to escape and, when the Guardians combine their powers, she is destroyed by W.I.T.C.H.
 Shagon, the Hate – The most powerful and dangerous of the Four Knights of Revenge. In the comics, Shagon is a tall, strong demon wearing a blue metal vest that (like the other Knights) bearing Nerissa's seal. He has a tail that can be used as a weapon. His hair resembles a nest of snakes, giving him a Medusa-like appearance. As a human, he works as a geologist doing research near Mount Thanos. While searching for his dog, Miska, he eventually encounters Nerissa who wants a human as "material" for her right-hand man. Shagon represents Nerissa's hatred for Kandrakar and feeds on expressions of hate. His life essence is nearly absorbed by Nerissa in the final battle but he wounds her and reverts to his original form. Despite his hatred, he does not forget his feelings as a human about the transformed dog Miska.
 Khor, the Destroyer – One of the Four Knights of Revenge and the first to encounter the Guardians. He used to be the dog Miska, but has the misfortune of crossing paths with Nerissa who transforms him into a purple-skinned, muscle man (resembling Vathek) who carries a pair of massive cleavers. He represents Nerissa's anger when she was locked away and desires to destroy Kandrakar. Even in this form, Khor still has the qualities of a loyal dog, sensing a bond with his former master, Shagon. In the final battle he is nearly absorbed by Nerissa but reverts to his original dog form. In the animated series, Mr. Huggles is transformed into Khor by the Heart of Meridian and reverts to his dormouse form. In the comics, in the final battle, he is nearly absorbed by Nerissa but reverts to his original dog form. According to Nerissa, the name "Khor" means destruction.
 Ember, the Pain – One of the Four Knights of Revenge, created by Nerissa. Ember was created from the lava that flowed around Nerissa's tomb. She looks like a slender woman, made of smoldering lava, with bat-like wings on her back and hair made of flames. Befitting her nature, she attacks her foes with blazing hot beams from her weapon – a type of trident. She represents the pain that Nerissa felt while being locked away, pain that she now wants to inflict on Kandrakar. She is absorbed by Nerissa in the final battle.
 Tridart, the Despair – One of the Four Knights of Revenge, created by Nerrisa. Tridart was made from the numerous icy stalactites found in the cave where Nerissa was sealed. His form is that of a bald, muscular man with large, angel-like wings. His weapon of choice is a short, double-edged axe. He represents the despair Nerissa felt in her prison and is absorbed by Nerissa in the final battle.
 Luba – The first Protector of the Aurameres, Luba is a Cat-Woman and a Member of Congregation of Kandrakar, whose role is of the Aurameres. Luba is against the Oracle's decision giving the job of Guardianship to young, inexperienced Earth teenagers. She causes a lot of trouble for the girls by fusing the Aurameres together on purpose, awakening Nerissa in the process. Luba eventually redeems herself by sacrificing her immortality to save the Guardians and Caleb.

Part III antagonists 
 Ari – A young farmer in the world of Arkhanta and a man of little means who struggles to make ends meet. His wife, Jamayeda, died giving birth to his son, Maqui, who was born mute and a loner. In an attempt to heal his son, Ari captures a banshee named Yua in order to force three wishes from her in return for her freedom. Unable to fulfill his wish (since she can only grant material wishes), Yua instead helps him to claim rulership over Arkanta, but instead of releasing her, Ari uses his last wish to bind Yua as his eternal servant. While doing his best to improve the lot of the common man, Ari declares war on the Oracle when the latter refuses to aid him in curing his son, but in the end regains his senses and abandons his hate due to the Guardians.
 Yua – The mightiest banshee on Arkanta. Tied into eternal servitude by Ari, Yua's hatred grows in captivity. She plots against Ari by fanning his paranoia against the Guardians and Kandrakar. Eventually her plans come to naught, but due to the efforts of W.I.T.C.H. and because she has come to love Maqui like an own son, Yua let go of her hate and ceased the pursuit of vengeance.
 Raphael "Ralph" Sylla – An Interpol detective who specializes in mysterious and/or supernatural phenomena. He stumbles upon a report from an officer in Green Bay, concerning the witnessing of Khor. The names of the five W.I.T.C.H. girls grabbed his attention. To observe the girls he gets a job as computer science teacher at the Sheffield Institute. He soon discovers he is on the right track. When he joins the student's exchange course he follows Taranee, Cornelia and Hay Lin. Sylla's cover is blown when Taranee defends Hay Lin's Astral Drop against him. Doing so his suspicions are confirmed and the girls become his enemies. Later he is pushed aside by his superiors. As revenge, he warns the girls about the threat to them. In the end, his and his colleagues' memories of W.I.T.C.H. and their enemies are erased from his mind by the Oracle.
 Dr. Theodore Riddle – An elite psychic detective that is brought in to combat the W.I.T.C.H. girls when their supernatural secret is exposed to the Government. Although his skills are impressive, ranging from mind control to telepathy, he is not powerful enough to combat W.I.T.C.H. directly. He carries a handgun because of his motto "bullets are always faster than the mind". He collaborates with Interpol's goal to study the W.I.T.C.H. girls. Although he was hired by Interpol, he seems to have his own agenda. The Oracle later removes any and all traces, even his memories of the girls, from his mind.
 Astral Will, Irma, Taranee, Cornelia, and Hay Lin – Originally thought to be mere substitutes, the Astral Drops develop personalities and grow tired of their treatment by the girls, who only call upon them when they need chores done or to take their place when they go on a mission. They soon turn against them, causing horrible problems for the girls on Earth, such as turning friends and family against them. Eventually, however, they are released from servitude and granted new identities.
Thomas Vandom – Will's biological father, a businessman who suffers from a ruthless win-or-lose drive that often gets him into trouble. For this reason, Susan Vandom separated from him before the start of the series, but Thomas rejects a divorce since he counts on her (most unwilling) financial support. To this end, he gives her the choice of either providing money for him or losing guardianship over Will in a court trial, but with ex-Guardian Kadma's help the crisis is averted and Vandom departs.
 Mark Zibosky – An infamous extortionist and criminal. He once held Jewell's friend Benjamin Crane hostage. He tried to escape, but is confronted by the Guardians and later apprehended.

Part IV antagonists 
 Endarno – A member of the Council of Kandrakar and a former warrior and close friend of the Oracle. His body is possessed by Phobos when he attempts to free himself and seize the power of Kandrakar by making the Council banish the old Oracle and promoted him to that position. After a long and hard struggle, the minds of Phobos and Endarno return to their respective bodies once Phobos is defeated, Himerish is restored to his old title, and Endarno became a friend and counsellor of W.I.T.C.H.
 Vaal – Endarno's loyal servant and a denizen of Meridian who unknowingly helps Phobos in his plans, believing he serves Endarno. He, in particular, does not understand why Endarno wants Elyon to abdicate since, like Meridian citizens, Vaal thinks of Elyon as a savior. His name is based on the Semitic god of fertility, vegetation and weather, named Baal.

Part V antagonists 
 Johnathan Ludmoore – Johnathan Ludmoore is the first Meridianite to travel to Earth. Phobos orders him to weaken the Veil by opening portals to enable travel between the two dimensions. He discovers that Heatherfield lies in a place where the five elements meet and tries to suppress them. When he fails, he disappears into his magic book of the five elements. When Cedric finds the book, Ludmoore uses him as a henchman to gather the five missing stones; representing the parts of the elements he could not suppress. When finished, he traps the Guardians, Orube and Cedric, in the book where Matt had already been imprisoned. In the end, the Guardians defeat Ludmoore after Cedric uses his own death as a means to open a portal to where Ludmoore resides.

Part VI antagonists 
 Tecla Ibsen – An old woman obsessed with regaining her youth, Tecla has the power to summon the Ragorlang and absorb vital energies of her victims through it. She sees the Guardians as rich sources of vital energy. After a final battle with Folkner and the Ragorlang, she and her husband Karl are welcomed in to Kandrakar by the Oracle and allowed to stay.
 Edward Folkner – The new doctor in the Sheffield Institute. He has travelled a lot looking for the Mark of the Ragorlang. He merges with the monsters trapped inside his magic box to drain the energy of every human being on Earth, but is defeated by W.I.T.C.H.

Part VII antagonists 
 Dark Mother – The evil and beautiful Elemental Queen of Earth who threatens both Kandrakar and the globe. Dark Mother used to be Meter, the Queen of Spring, but becomes a vile and bloodthirsty traitor when she uses her magic to transform herself into a monster, calling herself Dark Mother, and attempting to wipe Kandrakar off the map. The other Elemental Queens of Water, Fire, and Air fight and defeat her by banishing her beneath the woods of Heatherfield, trapped in a giant tree, though she could extend her roots through the earth to gather information. Her bonds are later unintentionally broken by Will, when she discovers the root to her powers.Dark Mother sends a black seed to Kandrakar, infiltrating its protective barrier, and slowly it took over the minds of the Elders. After she escapes from her earthly prison, Dark Mother infiltrates Kandrakar, turning it into her kingdom with the Oracle and the Elders under her control, save for Yan Lin. The W.I.T.C.H. near defeat, but in the end, the girls defeat her by sealing her in a stone tomb. Although Dark Mother is sealed away, her roots still threaten the foundation of Kandrakar, which the W.I.T.C.H. girls later save.
 Romur – A servant of Dark Mother along with his non-human brothers. Although he appears to be loyal to Dark Mother, deep down he is terrified and resents her. Romur helps Dark Mother by setting out her monsters to fight against W.I.T.C.H. when they try to find the roots of their new powers. Later he betrays Dark Mother by watering more star dust flowers (which Dark Mother used to penetrate Kandrakar's defenses), hiding them, and helping the W.I.T.C.H. girls use them to return to Kandrakar and fight against Dark Mother.

Part VIII antagonists 
 Professor Takeda – A cryogenics specialist who creates a unique device named "Coldness" which allows him to open a gateway to another world. When his older daughter Mariko discovers this, she ends up in a coma, with her mind dwelling in another dimension called the Fast Realm. Because of this tragic event, Takeda becomes an evil scientist conspiring to destroy everything magical, including the Guardians; he enlists help from a boy named Liam, who came from the alternate realm and is Mariko's first love. However, when his neglected younger daughter Shinobu turns his plans upside down, Takeda gradually returns to his senses and is reunited with his daughters.
 Arkaam, the White Queen – The malevolent and despotic ruler of the Fast World. She desires to kill Mariko and the Guardians, who stand in her way. She kills Liam when he tries to rescue Mariko and attempts to claim the Earth as part of her realm, but is destroyed by W.I.T.C.H., who combine their voices in a magical chorus that interferes with the vibrational frequency at which Arkaam and her army are vibrating, causing all of them to dissipate into nothingness.
 Liam – Professor Takeda's hitman and right hand man in these illegal activities. He comes from the Fast World to help Takeda bring Mariko, whom he loves, back to life and to spy on the Guardians. He is later sent to kidnap William and take him to the Fast Realm, but because William trusts him, Liam can't harm him and later aids W.I.T.C.H. in locating him and the Takeda sisters. He is murdered by the White Queen when he stands in the way of her blade that is meant for Mariko.

Part IX antagonists 
 The Runics – Five magical boys who control the elements just like the Guardians, though they use their powers for evil. Their captain is Nashter, who rules energy. Darmon rules fire, Shalin rules air, Cromo rules earth and Ran-rah rules water.
 Nihila – As Queen of the Loom, Nihila rules over the signs of the Zodiac. She uses the zodiac (except for Libra) to destroy the lives of the family and friends of the Guardians, but is defeated by Hay Lin.
 Orristurr – King of the Sharks, he invades the territory of Wishstarr, King of the Starfish, whom he imprisons. Orristurr wants to marry Wishstarr's daughter, Mareeve, to rule over Wishstarr's territory, but she escapes to the surface. She then lives on land, carrying the name Mary for two hundred years. He is defeated by both Mareeve and Irma.

Part X antagonists 
 Lady Giga – Youngest of the 3 ladies. She can absorb any type of energy.
 Lady Crash – Middle sister who has the power to control motorized vehicles. She turns into a car and captures Cornelia in order to drain W.I.T.C.H. of their powers. However, Cornelia escapes and leads her on a chase which drains her gasoline reserves, leaving her starving and helplessly disintegrating into oblivion.
 Lady Kimikal – The strongest and the oldest of the 3 ladies. She drains the W.I.T.C.H. girls and the magical children from their powers. Her greed for power leads to an overload of magic and perishes by it.

Other characters

Recurring characters 
 Uriah Dunn, Kurt Van Buren, and Laurent Hampton – The three bullies at Heatherfield High who love to cause trouble. Nigel was part of their gang until leaving to continue a relationship with Taranee. They are always getting themselves into mischief and detentions. They act as the girls' antagonists at school.
 Bess and Courtney Grumper – The scandalous sisters and the writers of the gossip section of the Sheffield Institute's newspaper. They love to ridicule and get people in trouble to see their reactions, but the W.I.T.C.H. girls – and especially Cornelia and Hay Lin – are their favorite targets. They are considered to be Principal Knickerbocker's pets, though they don't mind bribing students to stand behind them.
 Dean Collins – Will's History teacher. During the first story arc, he dates Will's mother, Susan, and after a while wins Will's acceptance; in the fifth story arc, he marries Susan, becoming Will's stepfather. Collins is kind and considerate, always thinking of his students and trying to help them, but he also tends to overreact. In issue 108, he reveals to Will (and only Will) that he was a lead singer in a band in college called "Greensuit", and after losing a record she bought, he gives her a complete record collection.
 William Collins – Will's half-brother is introduced into the story during part seven; he is usually called "Will", much to his sister's frustration. Willam proves to be magical from the first day of his life; his powers including floating bubbles to play in, enlarging his milk bottle for more milk, conjuring up astral butterflies and bringing plushies to life. He can read the minds of animals and humans. He can sense negative energies in others. Will is the only one who he shows his powers to. Will tries to teach him how to keep his powers under control while teaching others at the magic school in the Teach 2b W.I.T.C.H. saga.
 Grandmother Hale – The mother of Harold Hale, Cornelia's father. From time to time she visits the Hale family, who welcome her with mixed feelings. She is respected as an older family member, but hated for her high-strung, aloof opinions on her son's family, particularly her raising of Cornelia and some qualities of Elizabeth. Exceptions to the rule, include Mrs. Hale's offer to Cornelia of an opportunity that can be exploited for the benefit of W.I.T.C.H.
 Lilian Hale – Cornelia's younger sister by six or so years, who endlessly bothers her sister. She has a pet cat named Napoleon, originally a gift from Will to Cornelia after Phobos turns Caleb into a flower. In the Halloween special, sometime between the 7th and 8th sagas, Lilian sees the girls transform, but it is unclear if she retains that knowledge in the primary story line.
 Kandor – Appears at the start of the eighth saga. When the girls come to Yan Lin about the growing number of magical people in Heatherfield, Kandor is assigned to be their handler of the Teach 2b W.I.T.C.H. school. He also keeps the bus/magic-school in check, and travels the world looking for potential students (and procuring materials for his secret hobby, knitting). He is in a relationship with Margeret Hope at the end of issue 101. When the girls have to convince Margeret to believe in magic again to return her Raising Star, the essence of her magic; which she had abandoned after her first love moved away. It later returns but winds up in the engine of the W.I.T.C.H. bus. The girls were failing until Kandor arrived and the two quickly fell in love, which causes the star to return. He has the power to read the minds of others – only the surface of what they are currently thinking – and is kind-hearted. He occasionally struggles with the girls' pet friend We, who he is allergic to.
 We, Ew and Boring – a trio of Basiliade pets; white fur with plushy-ball tails with the power to become invisible, except their tails. Their names are due to the pattern on the bottoms of their feet that resemble the letters "W" and "E". We appeared at the end of the fourth saga and Ew early on in the ninth. We came with the then-Oracle Himerish, and was left in the care of Orube. We prefers to play with the girls when he feels like it, causing some mischief for them. Ew looks like We, but she has a small pink purse, is feminine, and sports short purple hair. She is constantly trying to kiss We, which he rejects, but allows out of guilt from her crying. Boring is We's Cousin who sports purple hair and according to We, he's called Boring because he's always bored. Sometimes We carries a small briefcase with him, from which he can take objects much larger than himself. We has also the capability of flying, using blue miniature wings.

Other characters 
 Agent Maria Medina – An Interpol agent from the crime psychology department who is assigned to investigate the Brown family's disappearance. Due to her experience on the job she believes that Will and her friends know something about Elyon's family's disappearance that they are not sharing and decides to keep an eye on them. At the end of the first saga, she and her partner conclude that Elyon and her family are "illegal aliens" – not realising how close they are to the truth. Near the end of the Third saga, the Oracle removes the knowledge of the girls and their secrets from her mind.
 Agent Joel McTiennan – Another Interpol agent who is investigates the Brown family's disappearance with Medina. He is a quiet guy who thinks that Agent Medina's theories are off-the-wall and that the case is a dead-end from which they will return empty-handed. Because of their different builds, McTiennan and Medina are affectionately referred to as "Big Guy and Small Fry" by their colleagues. At the end of the first saga, he and his partner conclude that Elyon and her family were "illegal aliens" – not realising how close they were to the truth. Near the end of the Third saga, the Oracle removes the knowledge of the girls and their secrets from his mind.
 Orube – A warrior of Basiliade, like the Oracle Himerish. She was the apprentice of Luba, the former Guardian of the Aurameres, and was introduced in the beginning of the third saga. Orube is a skilled warrior who finds Earth customs difficult to understand. She is in charge of WE after he arrived, but gives him to the girls due to allergies. Orube temporarily fills Taranee's place as Guardian when the girls have to prevent Ari of Arhkanta from letting the Banshee become too powerful. As she continues to fight with the girls, she admits that she blames them for her master's death at the hands of Nerrissa. The girls change her view of them as she stays in Heatherfield trying to be more human, and she accepts the girls as her friends. Orube leaves for Basiliade after Cedric, with whom she has fallen in love, died to save her at the end of the Ludmoore saga.
 Yarr – A Commander from Basilíade who meets the banished Oracle (now referred to as Himerish) while traveling with his minions, Kilubi and Ih-Sui. He recognizes him from the past as a battle partner. Now he serves Himerish loyally using a sword.
 Kilubi – The feisty and colder minion of Yarr. She has dark purple hair and pointed elfen ears. She has red paint around her eyes, appears somewhat tomboyish, with a gold breastplate and shoulder plates as her battle attire. Her weapon is a sword.
 Ih-Sui – The calmer and tranquil minion of Yarr. She hardly talks. Like Kilubi, Ih-Sui has Orube's hair color and uses a sword. She has slanted eyes and her battle attire is a Chinese suit with long, wide sleeves.
 Shinobu – The younger daughter of Takeda. Because of her father's obsession with Mariko, she feels lonely and left out. She finds William when she enters the Fast World. Later, Shinobu reveals that she has the ability to turn invisible.
 Mariko – The older daughter of Takeda who discovers a parallel dimension and is sent into a magical slumber; her body is left floating in a tank full of liquid in Takeda's laboratory under stasis-lock. She battles the ruler of the strange dimension as the Black Queen, until the W.I.T.C.H. girls are fooled by the White Queen into attacking her, imprisoning her with Shinobu and William. In the Fast World, she meets Liam and the two of them fall in love. The girls rescue her and end Takeda's vendetta.

References 

Comics characters introduced in 2001
Lists of comics characters
Magical girl characters